Daniel Richards may refer to:

Daniel H. Richards (1808–1877), American politician and newspaper editor
Daniel "2Dark" Richards (born 1983), British record producer 
Danny Richards, big band vocalist in the 1930s and 1940s
Daniel Richards (wrestler) (born 1979), American professional wrestler billed as the "Progressive Liberal"